is a 26-episode Japanese animated television series by Nippon Animation, broadcast from 1996 to 1997 in Japan on the Fuji Television network as an installment to Nippon Animation's famed World Masterpiece Theater series. The show was directed by Kōzō Kusuba, with Michiru Shimada and Mayumi Koyama writing the scripts, Masaru Ōshima designing the characters and Katsuhisa Hattori composing the music.

The story is adapted from Sans Famille, an 1878 French novel, written by Hector Malot (adapted to anime in 1977 as Nobody's Boy: Remi); this version made major changes from the book, including changing the sex of the main character and the "Swan" chapter, along with many other main events.

The first broadcast was on September 1, 1996. The show was canceled by Fuji TV because of low ratings and it ended on March 23, 1997, with a low count of 23 episodes. The complete series of 26 episodes was later shown by the anime satellite television network, Animax, which translated and dubbed the series into English for broadcast across its English-language networks in Southeast Asia and South Asia under the title Remi, Nobody's Girl. Most episodes were very hard to find, as well as other languages including Arabic which was named دروب ريمي (Remi's road), and was dubbed in the Venus Center in 2001 and broadcast on the Spacetoon channel where it received success in the Middle East.

In the Philippines, it was shown from 1999 to 2000 on ABS-CBN after airing the earlier TMS (boy) version.

Story
Remi, Nobody's Girl tells the story of Remi, a cheerful and tender-hearted girl, who is an excellent singer and lives in the French country town of Chavanon with her mother. One day her father returns to the town after a long period working in a city. She discovers that she was a "foundling" or an abandoned child and was adopted by Mother Barberin. Her adoptive father Jerome leaves to work in Paris and expects Mother Barberin to send Remi to the workhouse. He returns 10 years later, finds that Remi is still there, and becomes furious and Remi is sold to an evil slave trader.

Vitalis, a strolling entertainer, tricks the slave trader and frees Remi. Vitalis discovers her talent for singing and takes her in with his troupe. Remi starts her journey with Vitalis and his troupe of animals such as the monkey Joli-Cœur and the dogs Capi, Dolce, and Zerbino. She meets a variety of different people and strives to help everyone she meets, such as saving a man from a fire, and rescuing her dog with the help of a sailor. Also on her journeys with Vitalis and his company she must endure and overcome many difficulties while looking for her real family, particularly at one point where Vitalis is falsely accused of arson, loses his cart in the fire and is imprisoned. At this point, Mrs Milligan takes pity on Remi and takes her to her house, where Remi meets Mrs Milligan's son Arthur.

After Vitalis is released, he is forced to sell his donkey as they are broke. He asks Mrs Milligan to take care of Remi and decided to leave her, however Remi, unable to bear the thought of leaving Mr. Vitalis alone, runs after him as she wants to provide him company. At this point it becomes clear that Vitalis is visibly unwell. After parting ways, Arthur explained about the amulet Remi has similarly to her mother's immediately realising Remi is her real daughter.

During a performance, Joli-Cœur is hit by a chariot and nearly dies. Unfortunately the village they were currently staying in lacked the presence of a doctor, let alone a veterinarian. With Remi pleading with Mr Vitalis, he agrees and decides to brave through the snow storm to take Joli-Cœur to another village for treatment. Along the way, the snowstorm intensifies and they are forced to take shelter. Sadly for their troupe, they become a target for wolves. They manage to chase the wolves away, but not before Dolce and Zerbino's die trying to protect them, with only Capi, Joli-Cœur and Vitalis left along with Remi. The wolves also injure Vitalis. Heartbroken, Remi begins to cry, but Vitalis urges her to keep moving forward, to ensure that Dolce and Zerbino's death does not go to vain. Along the way however, Vitalis' condition worsens and he is unable to proceed. He urges Remi to rush to the city of Paris to provide treatment for Joli-Cœur, and luckily he survives. But Vitalis' condition has worsened and he passes away, telling a heartbroken Remi to always be cheerful and to always keep moving forward.

After Vitalis' death, she tries to meet Gaspard in Paris, who is Vitalis' acquaintance. However, when she reaches Gaspard's house, she finds out that the person Mr. Vitalis was talking about was actually Gaspard's uncle, who had died due to flu. She also meets the homeless children that he treats like slaves. She became friends with all other homeless children, due to her compassionate and joyful nature, and she protects the other children from Gaspards corporate punishments. She stops Mattia from stealing money through pickpocketing and enjoys listening to him play violin. She helps improve the relationships between all the children in the house and is always the first one to take initiative while helping others, such as when one of the children fall ill. She also meets a travelling troupe who have a disobedient daughter called Cosette and manages to get her to warm up to her parents. Upon learning that Remi is the long-lost daughter of Milligan and Arthur's older sister, Gaspard decides to kidnap her for ransom, and Mattia tries his best to protect her from him and his cohorts with the help of Capi and Joli-Cœur. After Gaspard and his cohorts are arrested and jailed for their crimes, Remi reunites with her real family, and Milligan decides to adopt the homeless children. In the end, Remi decides to visit her adoptive mother in Chavanon after reuniting with her real family, while Mattia wants to study hard and become a famous violin player so that he can become a better man for Remi. The two are last seen watching the sunset, remembering Vitalis and his dogs Zerbino and Dolce.

Characters

Vitalis Troupe

 

 A bright and energetic 10-year-old girl who is an excellent singer. She was raised in a French village called Chavanon, but she does not know where she was born. After her father, Jerome, returns from Paris, he becomes upset that she was still at his house. Her mother reveals to Remi that she was a foundling and it is unknown where her real parents reside. Jerome sells her to a slave trader, until she was later rescued by Vitalis. She becomes part of Vitalis' troupe and sings and performs with his band. Towards the end of the series, She is revealed as the biological daughter of Milligan and the older sister of Arthur.

The owner of three dogs and a monkey. He is a performer from Italy who travels throughout France. He is skilled at playing the violin. At first glance, he appears frightful; however, he is very kind. He taught Remi to read and write because there was no school in her hometown. Because of his old age, he became sick and died at the end of episode 13.

The monkey in Vitalis' company. He acts almost like a human and is a natural entertainer. He is also very mischievous. He was run over by a wagon and needs to receive proper treatment from a veterinarian. He survives and continues his journey with Remi and Capi.

A dog of Vitalis' company. He has a sense of responsibility and strong leadership qualities. His name comes from the Italian "capitano". He protected Remi and Joli-Coeur from wolves but lost his fellow dog companions. After Vitalis died, he continues his journey with Remi and Joli-Coeur.

A dog of Vitalis' company. He is known as the cool one. Zerbino is the Italian word for "dandy". He was killed when defending Remi and Joli-Coeur from wolves.

A French Bulldog of Vitalis' company. She becomes attached to everyone. The name "Dolce" is the Italian word for "gentle". She was killed when defending Remi and Joli-Coeur from wolves.

Barberin Family

Remi's adoptive mother. Her husband, Jerome, found Remi abandoned as a child on a street corner of Paris. Afterwards, Jerome leaves to work in Paris and Anne raises Remi in secret.

Remi's little sister. She is the only child of Anne Barberin.

Remi's adoptive father. While in Paris, he found Remi as a baby, abandoned in an alleyway. Seeing that she came from a wealthy family, he believes that he would be given a reward if she was given back to her family. However, he could not find her family and took her home with him to Chavanon Village. He goes away to Paris to work and expects his wife to get rid of Remi and send her to the workhouse. He returns ten years later because of a work injury and sells Remi to a slave trader to get money.

Milligan Family

A widowed English lady who meets Remi in Toulouse and believes that Vitalis is innocent. She searches for her daughter who was kidnapped not long after birth. After Arthur told her about the brooch that Remi had that was similar to hers, she realized that Remi was her daughter.

Mrs. Milligan's son who is paralyzed and in a wheelchair. He was initially cold towards Remi, but became good friends with her. He believed that everyone was only worried about his health and that he was a burden to them. When Remi tries to save him from falling into the river, he tells her that he may be better off dead than alive. However, Remi made him realize that if he dies, his mother will die as well since she will have no one else to look after anymore. Hearing those words, he returns to his lively self. He found out from his mother that he is Remi's brother.

Nelly is the maid of the Milligan household.

Gaspard's Children

The nephew of Vitalis' acquaintance. He uses homeless children and treats them like slaves. He uses the money he collects from them for his own purposes and is later arrested as a result of his crimes. He is based on Garofoli from the original story and the main antagonist in the episodes 14 - 26.

One of the boys who has lived with Gaspard. He is the leader of the children. To earn his living for Gaspard, he and Ricardo pickpocket from the wealthy. He stopped stealing after listening to Remi's pleas. He became attached to Remi because of her kindness and gentleness. He is also good at playing the violin. His parents passed away when he was Lise's age before being taken to an orphanage and later sent to a circus, until the ring leader sold him to Gaspard. In the last episode, he promised to work hard so that he can be in same social status and ask Remi to be with him forever.

One of the boys who lived with Gaspard. Just like Mattia, he pickpockets from the wealthy so Gaspard will let him stay. He is a friend of Mattia but they frequently argue.

One of the girls who lived with Gaspard.

One of the girls who lived with Gaspard. She became good friends with Remi after she protected her from Gaspard's abuse.

One of the boys who lived with Gaspard. He briefly took care of a white kitten whom he called Shiro, but he eventually had to return it to its owner.

Michelle Family

Came from a street performer family and became Remi's friend.

Recurring Characters

The family cow, which was sold because Jerome's friend paid for Jerome's treatment and he was promised to give away Rosette in return.

An orphaned boy who has a younger sister, Nina, who became unable to speak after their mother died. The siblings live in an orphanage managed by nuns. Pierre is very mischievous, yet very kind to his sister.

The younger sister of Pierre.

A young sailor who used to live in a village near Ussel.

Episode List 

 A Sad Birthday
 Goodbye Mother
 Vitalis Troupe
 A Great Gift
 Miracle of The St. Maria Statue
 Mother'S Phantom
 Another Family
 Goodbye To our Home
 Fateful Encounter
 Lonely Arthur
 The Secret of The Pendant
 The Snowy Mountain of Sadness
 Farewell on a Snowy Day
 Beginning of a New Journey
 New Friends
 A Kitten on a Rainy Day
 A Pledge in an Underground Maze
 A Mother and Child's Close Encounter
 A Traveling Family
 Soul Mate
 Violin of Memories
 Surviving The Underground
 Both of Their Wishes
 Love Torn Apart
 Escape
 My Mother

Music
Opening theme

Lyrics: Masashi Sada
Composition and arrangement: Katsuhisa Hattori
Performance: Masashi Sada

Ending theme

Lyrics: Fumiko Okada
Composition and arrangement: Katsuhisa Hattori
Performance: Youca

See also
Sans Famille, the novel by Hector Malot on which this anime was based.
Nobody's Boy: Remi, a 1977-1978 anime television series by Tokyo Movie Shinsha in which Remi is a boy, as in the novel Sans Familie.

External links 
  

1996 anime television series debuts
Fuji TV original programming
Hector Malot anime series
World Masterpiece Theater series
Television shows set in France